Coleophora internitens is a moth of the family Coleophoridae. It is found on the Canary Islands (Fuerteventura), Tunisia and Spain.

References

internitens
Moths described in 1999
Moths of Africa
Moths of Europe